is a town located in Hidaka Subprefecture, Hokkaido, Japan. Shinhidaka is the most populous town, and the economic center of Hidaka Subprefecture.

History
The river valleys of what is now Shinhidaka were occupied by the Ainu. From the 19th century, people from Japan began to settle in the region.

On March 31, 2006, the town of Mitsuishi merged with the town of Shizunai to create the new town of Shinhidaka.

Geography
Shinhidaka is in southeastern Hokkaido, between the Pacific Ocean to the South and the Hidaka Mountains to the North. Several rivers rise in the mountains and empty into the sea, including the Shizunai River and the Mitsuishi River.

Shinhidaka has total area of 1,147.74 km2. Its highest location is Mount Kamuiekuuchikaushi at 1,979.4 m (6,494 ft).

Climate

Demographics
As of November 2021, the town has an estimated population of 21,415, and a density of 18.7 persons per km2.

Transportation

Rail
Shinhidaka was served by the JR Hokkaido Hidaka Main Line. Plans to restore this section of the line have been abandoned, due to declining passenger use and very high maintenance costs and the section will be officially closed on 1 April 2021 to be replaced by a bus service.

Stations in Shinhidaka:  -  -  -  -  -  -

Arts and culture
, literally, road 20 ken in width, is an avenue lined with  trees and a major tourist attraction of the town. The  road was created for a visit of the Imperial Family to the nearby Niikappu horse ranch in 1903. The ranch is under the jurisdiction of the Imperial Household Agency. It took five years to transplant trees from the local mountains to create the avenue. It was finished in 1916. Shinhidaka holds a cherry blossom festival yearly in May at the road in Shizunai ward.

Mascots

They are superhero siblings.

Kobuman is from Mitsuishi. He is usually active in events. He became mascot on 2 February 2013.
Kobume-chan became mascot on 10 August 2017. Like her brother, she is also usually active in events.

Sister cities
 Lexington, Kentucky (United States)
 Minamiawaji, Hyōgo Prefecture (Japan)
 Mima, Tokushima Prefecture (Japan)
 Sumoto, Hyōgo Prefecture (Japan)

References

External links
Official Website 

 
Towns in Hokkaido